Nivica is a surname of Albanian origin. Notable people with the surname include:

Hodo Nivica (1809–1852), Albanian revolutionary
Sali Nivica (1890–1920), Albanian politician and journalist

Albanian-language surnames